Bauer's chameleon gecko (Eurydactylodes agricolae) is a nocturnal species of lizard in the family Diplodactylinae.  The species is endemic to Grande Terre in New Caledonia.

Etymology
The specific name, agricolae, is in honor of American herpetologist Aaron Matthew Bauer.  The German noun, Bauer, means "farmer" in English, which becomes agricola (genitive singular, agricolae) when translated into Latin.

Habitat

Description

Reproduction
E. agricolae is oviparous.

References

Further reading
Henkel FW, Böhme W (2001). "A new carphodactyline gecko of the New Caledonian genus Eurydactylodes (Sauria: Gekkonidae". Salamandra 37 (3): 149–156. (Eurydactylodes agricolae, new species). (in English, with an abstract in German).

Eurydactylodes
Reptiles described in 2001
Taxa named by Friedrich Wilhelm Henkel
Taxa named by Wolfgang Böhme (herpetologist)
Geckos of New Caledonia